John Michael Frullo (born August 27, 1962) is a Republican politician who represents district 84 in the Texas House of Representatives.

Personal life
John M. Frullo was born on August 27, 1962, and graduated in 1984 with a degree in accounting from the University of Wyoming. He has two adult sons. For several years, Frullo worked as a CPA auditing government entities and businesses. In 1993, he purchased a printing business in Lubbock, Texas. Currently, he owns a commercial printing, design, and advertisement company known as Midtown Printing and Graphics, Inc.

Political career
Frullo, a Republican, was sworn in to represent district 84 in the Texas House of Representatives on November 22, 2010, succeeding Carl Isett. District 84 includes the majority of Lubbock, including most of central Lubbock. Representative Frullo serves on the Higher Education Committee and the Culture Recreation and Tourism Committee. Frullo has previously served on International Relations and Economic Development Committee, State Affairs Committee, Insurance Committee, and the Calendars Committee.

References

21st-century American politicians
Republican Party members of the Texas House of Representatives
1962 births
Living people
People from Lubbock, Texas
University of Wyoming alumni